August Klein (1870-1913) was an architect of German origin, who worked in Vilnius. from 1891 till 1896 studied in Saint Petersburg. Among his prominent works are Vileišis Palace, completed in 1906, and Church of the Exaltation of the Holy Cross in Vileyka.

1870 births
1913 deaths
Architects from Vilnius
Polish people of German descent
People from Warsaw Governorate
Saint-Petersburg State University of Architecture and Civil Engineering alumni